Miss Philippines Earth 2009 was the 9th edition of the Miss Philippines Earth pageant. The grand coronation night was held on May 10, 2009, at The Arena Entertainment and Recreational Center of the People, San Juan. Fifty contestants competed for the title. The event was broadcast by ABS-CBN in the Philippines and by The Filipino Channel internationally.

Karla Henry, the winner of Miss Philippines Earth 2008 and Miss Earth 2008, crowned Sandra Seifert as Miss Philippines Earth 2009. Seifert represented the Philippines in the Miss Earth 2009. Maria Venus Raj relinquished her crown to Grezilda Adelantar as Miss Philippines Eco Tourism who also won Miss PAGCOR. The Miss Philippines Fire crown held by Kristelle Lazaro was won by Patricia Tumulak and also obtained the title Miss Science and Technology. Marie Razel Eguia crowned Michelle Braun as Miss Philippines Air, while Marian Michelle Oblea crowned Catherine Loyola as Miss Philippines Water.

Results
Color keys

Note: Kirstie Joan Babor of Alegria, Cebu was later on proclaimed as the replacement of Catherine Loyola as Miss Philippines Water 2009

Special Titles

Special awards
Press Releases

 Major Awards
 Minor/Sponsor Awards

Contestants
Here are the 50 contestants that competed for the title Miss Philippines Earth 2009:

Judges

Environmental activities

2009 Lil' Earth Angels
Miss Lil' Earth Angels 2009 is the third edition of Miss Lil' Earth Angels pageant, the younger version of the Miss Philippines Earth beauty pageant. The finale of Miss Lil' Earth Angels for 2009 was held at the Robinsons Galleria in Quezon City, Philippines on April 24, 2009.

Results

Notes

References

External links
Official Website
Lil' Earth Angels Official Website
Woman of the Earth

2009
2009 beauty pageants
2009 in the Philippines
May 2009 events in the Philippines